"Beau-papa" is a song by French singer Vianney, which is included on his third album N'attendons pas. It was released as a single on August 21, 2020, being the second single to be released by the French record label Tôt ou Tard. The song is dedicated to Vianney's stepdaughter.

Music video 
The music video of "Beau-Papa", which was produced in collaboration with Valentin Vignet, was released on October 23, 2020. It was filmed near the island of Noirmoutier. The music video shows Vianney in a barque, where he is facing his stepdaughter.

Charts

Weekly charts

Year-end charts

References

External links 
 Official music video

2020 songs
Vianney (singer) songs
2020 singles